Billy Frampton (born 20 November 1996) is an Australian rules footballer currently playing for the Collingwood Football Club . He was selected with the 84th pick in the 2014 AFL Draft, but did not make his debut until the 23rd round of the 2018 AFL season against Essendon Football Club on 24 August 2018. Prior to his AFL debut, Frampton played 42 games and kicked 18 goals for Port Adelaide reserves in the South Australian National Football League, gaining a following with his aggressive style of play.

Statistics
Updated to the end of the 2022 season.

|-
| 2015 ||  || 38
| 0 || — || — || — || — || — || — || — || — || — || — || — || — || — || — || — || —
|- 
| 2016 ||  || 38
| 0 || — || — || — || — || — || — || — || — || — || — || — || — || — || — || — || —
|-
| 2017 ||  || 14
| 0 || — || — || — || — || — || — || — || — || — || — || — || — || — || — || — || —
|- 
| 2018 ||  || 14
| 1 || 1 || 2 || 6 || 1 || 7 || 5 || 0 || 15 || 1.0 || 2.0 || 6.0 || 1.0 || 7.0 || 5.0 || 0.0 || 15.0
|-
| 2019 ||  || 14
| 2 || 3 || 2 || 11 || 12 || 23 || 3 || 3 || 1 || 0.0 || 0.1 || 9.4 || 5.5 || 14.8 || 4.6 || 1.5 || 0.5
|- 
| 2020 ||  || 22
| 5 || 5 || 1 || 22 || 18 || 40 || 17 || 5 || 20 || 1.0 || 0.2 || 4.4 || 3.6 || 8.0 || 3.4 || 1.0 || 4.0
|-
| 2021 ||  || 22
| 10 || 2 || 11 || 64 || 33 || 97 || 50 || 8 || 24 || 0.2 || 1.1 || 6.4 || 3.3 || 9.7 || 5.0 || 0.8 || 2.4
|-
| 2022 ||  || 22
| 6 || 1 || 0 || 82 || 26 || 108 || 39 || 0 || 0 || 0.2 || 0.0 || 13.7 || 4.3 || 18.0 || 6.5 || 0.0 || 0.0
|- class=sortbottom
! colspan=3 | Career
! 24 !! 12 !! 16 !! 185 !! 90 !! 275 !! 39 !! 16 !! 60 !! 0.5 !! 0.7 !! 7.7 !! 3.8 !! 11.5 !! 4.8 !! 0.7 !! 2.5
|}

Notes

References

External links

Living people
1996 births
Port Adelaide Football Club players
Port Adelaide Football Club players (all competitions)
Australian rules footballers from Western Australia
Adelaide Football Club players